The Rt Hon. James Pierce Maxwell, 9th Baron Farnham (1813 – 26 October 1896), was an Irish peer, Nova Scotia baronet and Member of Parliament. He was known as The Hon. James Pierce Maxwell between September 1838 and June 1884.

He was the son of The Rev. The 6th Baron Farnham and Lady Anne Butler. He became a Member of Parliament for County Cavan on 17 February 1843. As a Lieutenant-Colonel in the 97th Foot, he was severely wounded during the Crimean War.

On his brother's death, he succeeded on 4 June 1884 as The 9th Baron Farnham, and later the next year, on 4 December 1885, he succeeded his distant cousin as 12th Baronet of Calderwood. Lord Farnham died unmarried and was succeeded by his nephew, Somerset Henry Maxwell.

References 

Kidd, Charles, Williamson, David (editors). Debrett's Peerage and Baronetage (1990 edition). New York: St Martin's Press, 1990.
 
 
 
 Peerage.com - Lt.-Col. James Pierce Maxwell, 9th Baron Farnham

External links 
 Cavan County Museum - The Farnham Gallery
 Farnham Estate

1813 births
1896 deaths
Members of the Parliament of the United Kingdom for County Cavan constituencies (1801–1922)
UK MPs 1841–1847
UK MPs 1847–1852
UK MPs 1852–1857
UK MPs 1857–1859
UK MPs 1859–1865
Farnham, B9
Politicians from County Cavan
19th-century Irish people
9